The 1892 New Hampshire gubernatorial election was held on November 8, 1892. Republican nominee John Butler Smith defeated Democratic nominee Luther F. McKinney with 50.17% of the vote.

General election

Candidates
Major party candidates
John Butler Smith, Republican
Luther F. McKinney, Democratic

Other candidates
Edgar L. Carr, Prohibition
William O. Noyes, People's

Results

References

1892
New Hampshire
Gubernatorial